Davoud Mahabadi (born 21 August 1973 in Tehran) is an Iranian football manager and former player.

Honours

Manager

Gahar Zagros
Azadegan League (1): 2011–12

References

External links

Iranian football managers
Iranian footballers
Iran international footballers
Esteghlal F.C. players
Zob Ahan Esfahan F.C. players
Esteghlal Ahvaz players
Rah Ahan players
People from Tehran
1973 births
Living people
Association football defenders
F.C. Nassaji Mazandaran managers
Shahin Bushehr F.C. managers
Gahar Zagros F.C. managers